KBS World is a South Korean pay television channel operated by the Korean Broadcasting System aimed at international audiences outside South Korea. It was launched on 1 July 2003 and mainly broadcast in Korean, but subtitles in English, Chinese and Malay are also provided.

Apart from the signals from Seoul, there are three separate services operated by KBS's subsidiaries for specific market: the Japanese version of KBS World, operated by KBS Japan, targets Japanese audiences, the Indonesian version of KBS World, operated by OKTN, targets Indonesian audiences, while the American version of KBS World, operated by KBS America, targets Koreans in North and South America.

Programming 
Programs on KBS World are sourced from KBS's two domestic television services; KBS1 and KBS2. Just about all genres of programming can be seen in KBS World television service including news, dramas, documentaries and children's programming. Broadcasts mostly in Korean, it also shows an English language news bulletin, KBS World News Today, on weekdays, and other original productions like The Three Colors of Korea.

Sister channels 
KBS World also operates KBS Korea, which airs Korean news, current affairs, talk shows, documentaries and culturally-oriented programming for overseas Koreans.

Internet 
KBS World TV also provides live streaming services on its official YouTube channel. Alongside streaming its main feed, it also streams World 24, and maintains a library of past programs to watch on demand with most available via closed captioning in English and other languages. Opened in 2015, the World TV feed became available online in North America and other countries, particularly those without strict copyright regulations.

On 12 March 2018, KBS World TV's YouTube channel temporarily stopped the World TV online stream to these areas, citing the channel's internal problems. Since July 2021, the Korea feed is now available for streaming.

See also 
 Korean Broadcasting System
 KBS World Radio
 KBS America
 Arirang TV
 Arirang Radio

References

External links 
 

World
Korean-language television stations
Television channels and stations established in 2003
2003 establishments in South Korea